is the 4th major single by the Japanese girl idol group Shiritsu Ebisu Chugaku. It was released in Japan on June 5, 2013 by Defstar Records.

Release details 
"Te o Tsunagō / Kindan no Karma" is a double A-side single.  The single was released in three versions: Limited Edition A, Limited Edition B, and Subculture Edition (Regular Edition).  "Te o Tsunagō" is the Japanese ending theme song for Pocket Monsters Best Wishes Season 2: Decolora Adventure, which aired from April 25 to October 3, 2013, while "Sakura-go-round" is the ending theme song for Pocket Monsters Best Wishes Season 2: Episode N, which aired from January 17 to April 18, 2013.

Members 
Shiritsu Ebisu Chugaku: Mizuki, Rika Mayama, Natsu Anno, Ayaka Yasumoto, Aika Hirota, Mirei Hoshina, Hirono Suzuki, Rina Matsuno, Hinata Kashiwagi.

Track listing

Limited Pokémon Edition (Limited A Edition)

Limited Karma Edition (Limited B Edition)

Subculture Edition (Regular Edition)

Charts

References

External links 
 Double A-side single "Te o Tsunagō / Kindan no Karma" - Shiritsu Ebisu Chugaku official site
 Reviews
 Review: Shiritsu Ebisu Chugaku "Te o Tsunagō / Kindan no Karma" - Rolling Stone Japan
 Music videos on YouTube (not available outside Japan)
  
 

Shiritsu Ebisu Chugaku songs
2013 singles
Japanese-language songs
Defstar Records singles
Songs from Pokémon
Songs written by Katsuhiko Sugiyama